Henry Hetherington (7 November 1928 – October 1987) was an English professional footballer who played as a winger for Sunderland.

References

1928 births
1987 deaths
Sportspeople from Chester-le-Street
Footballers from County Durham
English footballers
Association football wingers
Sunderland A.F.C. players
Gateshead F.C. players
English Football League players